The Bridge (Russian: Мост; Most, Estonian: Sild) is an Estonian-Russian crime drama television series, developed by Konstantin Statskiy, broadcast on the NTV network in Russia and TV3 in Estonia, and based on the Danish-Swedish series Broen/Bron. The show stars Lithuanian actress Ingeborga Dapkūnaitė and Russian actor Mikhail Porechenkov in pivotal roles. The complete series consists of two seasons of 10 episodes each. The series debuted on NTV in the Russian Federation in 2018, also on TV3 in Estonia in 2019. The show is broadcast in both Estonian and Russian languages.

The second series start on May 22, 2020. The final episode was posted on July 24, 2020 and ended with a cliffhanger.

The series begins with the discovery of a dead body exactly on the centre of the Friendship Bridge, which links Narva with Ivangorod, necessitating a joint investigation. Ingeborga Dapkūnaitė, as the Estonian police detective Inga Veermaa, stars in all two series. In the first and second, her Russian counterpart, Maksim Kazantsev, is played by Mikhail Porechenkov. It was broadcast on the Russian NTV Channel during the spring of 2018.

Background
The Russian version takes place on the Russian and Estonian border where a murdered body on a bridge between Narva and Ivangorod (the Friendship Bridge (Narva) on the Russo-Estonian border over the Narva River) and brings together Narva detective, Inga Veermaa (Dapkūnaitė) who is mentored by Saint-Petersburg detective Maksim Kazantsev (Porechenkov), while Dapkūnaitė's character was originally called Inga Savisaar.

Series overview

Plot
The action of the series takes place on the border of Russia and Estonia. The centerpiece of the film is the bridge on the border, and a discovery of a female corpse. The body is found between the Russian town of Ivangorod and the Estonian city of Narva. The police forces of the two countries investigating the incident find that the upper part of the corpse belongs to a politician from Estonia and the lower part to a student from St. Petersburg. The Russian Investigator is Maxim Kazantsev, the Estonian is Inspector Inga Veermaa. Together they investigate a series of crimes that are well prepared, skillfully executed and contain a "message" to society on the subject of social injustice.

Gradually Inga and Maksim understand that the perpetrator is only posing as a fighter for the truth. At the heart of the action is the motive of personal revenge, while the main enemy is Maksim himself.

Cast
 Ingeborga Dapkūnaitė as Detective Chief Inspector Inga Veermaa
 Mikhail Porechenkov as Detective Maksim Kazantsev
 Mariya Skuratova as Lena
 Alyona Kuchkova as Sveta
 Yury Kovalev as Nikolai 
 Denis Portnov as doctor
 Yury Utkin as Poletaev
 Dmitry Novikov as owner of a strip club
 Igor Papylev as reporter
 Stanislav Nikolaev
 Daniil Kokin
 Sofya Mironova as girl hostage

See also
 The Bridge (2011 TV series)
 The Bridge (2013 TV series)
 The Tunnel (TV series)

References

External links
В Петербурге начались съемки российской версии легендарного сериала «Мост», Russian Report
Телеканал НТВ покажет российскую адаптацию сериала «Мост», Official report
Rahvusvaheliselt üliedukas krimisari "Sild" jõuab TV3 ekraanile!, Estonian Report

NTV (Russia) original programming
TV3 (Estonia) original programming
The Bridge (TV series)
2018 Russian television series debuts
2010s Estonian television series
2010s Russian television series
Russian crime television series
Russian drama television series
Serial drama television series
Russian-language television shows
Television shows set in Russia
Television shows set in Estonia
Television shows remade overseas
Fictional portrayals of the Saint Petersburg Police